Rahui Road railway station is a railway station on the Bakhtiyarpur–Tilaiya line under the Danapur railway division of East Central Railway zone. It is situated beside National Highway 31 at Patasang in Nalanda district in the Indian state of Bihar.

Trains at Rahui Road Railway Station
Danapur passenger (Runs Daily)
Bakhtiyarpur memu (Mon-Sat)
Gaya Bakhtiyarpur memu (Mon-Sat)
Bakhtiyarpur memu (Mon-Sat)
Tilaiya Danapur passenger (Runs Daily)

References 

Railway stations in Nalanda district
Danapur railway division